The Roman Catholic Diocese of Nancheng is a diocese located in Nancheng (Jiangxi) in the Ecclesiastical province of Nanchang in China.

History
 November 29, 1932: Established as Apostolic Prefecture of Jianchangfu 建昌府 from the Apostolic Vicariate of Yujiang 餘江
 December 13, 1938: Promoted as Apostolic Vicariate of Nancheng 南城
 April 11, 1946: Promoted as Diocese of Nancheng 南城

Leadership
 Bishops of Nancheng 南城 (Roman rite)
 Bishop Patrick Cleary, S.S.C.M.E. (April 11, 1946 – October 23, 1970)
 Vicars Apostolic of Nancheng 南城 (Roman Rite)
 Bishop Patrick Cleary, S.S.C.M.E. (December 13, 1938 – April 11, 1946)
 Prefects Apostolic of Jianchangfu 建昌府 (Roman Rite)
 Fr. Patrick Cleary, S.S.C.M.E. (later Bishop) (July 21, 1933 – December 13, 1938)

References

 GCatholic.org
 Catholic Hierarchy

Roman Catholic dioceses in China
Christian organizations established in 1932
Roman Catholic dioceses and prelatures established in the 20th century
Religion in Jiangxi